The Bassa (also spelled Basa or Basaa and sometimes known as Bassa-Bakongo) are a Bantu ethnic group in Cameroon. They number approximately 800,000 individuals. The Bassa speak the Basaa language.

History
For centuries, the Bassa lived along the Atlantic coast of what is now Cameroon. They lived off subsistence farming and fishing.

The Bassa were displaced by Duala and early European traders, suffering exploitation and marginalization during the era of German Kamerun. Their fishing and farming efforts shrunk. During this German era, most Bassa were anti-colonialists, fighting against German expansion beyond the coast. However, they suffered a major defeat and were  subjected to forced labor in the construction of the Douala-Yaoundé "Mittel Kamerun" railway. 
 
Throughout the era of European colonial presence, the Bassa were able to take advantage of Christian missionaries to attain a Western-style education, particularly from German Protestants and American Presbyterians.

The Bassa played a lead role during decolonization, and the Bassa-Bakongo region was a hotbed of radical anti-colonial nationalism, particularly the Union des Populations du Cameroun (UPC). However, the Bassa brand of anti-colonialism ultimately lost out during the creation of the postcolonial nation of Cameroon.

Contemporary culture and politics
Despite their marginalization in the postcolonial state, there remains a belief in a "Nka kunde" or national liberation that has yet to occur.

Notable individuals
 Carlos Baleba (born 2004), footballer
 Blick Bassy, singer-songwriter
 Joel Embiid (born 1994), NBA basketball player
 Werewere Liking (born 1950), writer, playwright and performer
 Achille Mbembe (born 1957), philosopher, political theorist and public intellectual

References

 
Ethnic groups in Cameroon